Resinicium bicolor is a fungal plant pathogen infecting Douglas firs.

References

Fungal conifer pathogens and diseases
Fungi described in 1805
Agaricomycetes